Alberic is a name closely related to Aubrey.

People with the name:

People with the mononym
Alberic I, Count of Dammartin (died after 1162)
Alberic II, Count of Dammartin (died 1183)
Alberic III of Dammartin (died 1200)
Alberic I of Spoleto (died c.925), Duke of Spoleto
Alberic II of Spoleto (912–954), ruler of Rome 932–954
Alberic III, Count of Tusculum (died 1044)
Alberic of Cîteaux (died 1109), one of the founders of the Cistercian Order
Alberic of Humbert, archbishop of Reims 1207–1218
 Alberic of London, a possible Third Vatican Mythographer
Alberic of Monte Cassino (died 1088), Cardinal in the Roman Catholic Church
Alberic of Ostia (1080–1148), Benedictine monk and Cardinal Bishop of Ostia 
Alberic of Trois-Fontaines (died c. 1252), monk and Cistercian chronicler
Albericus de Rosate (c. 1290 – 1354 or 1360), an Italian jurist
Alberic[us] de Ver or Aubrey de Vere II (c. 1085 – 1141), master chamberlain of England
Alberik I van Utrecht, Saint Alberic of Utrecht (died 784), Benedictine monk and bishop of Utrecht
Alberik II, bishop of Utrecht from 838 to 844
 Master Alberic, (fl. 1118-1136), Rheims

People with the given name
Albéric Bourgeois (1876–1962), French-Canadian cartoonist
Albéric Clément (c. 1165 – 1191), the first Marshal of France
Albéric Collin (1886–1962), Belgian sculptor
Alberic Crescitelli (1863–1900), Catholic priest and martyr
Alberico Gentili (1552–1608), Italian lawyer
Albéric Magnard (1865–1914), French composer
Albéric de Montgolfier (born 1964), French politician
Albéric O'Kelly de Galway (1911–1980), Belgian chess champion
Albéric Pont (1870–1960), French dentist
Albéric Second (1817–1887), French writer
Alberich Zwyssig (1808–1854), a Cistercian monk who composed the Swiss national anthem
Alberik de Suremain (born 1950), a Guatemalan rower
Albéric (Briek) Schotte (1919-2004), a Belgian cyclist, twice World Road Race Champion (1948, 1950)

See also
Alberich (disambiguation)
Aubrey (disambiguation)
Rosa 'Albéric Barbier', a popular rambling rose cultivar 
Canon Alberic's Scrap-Book, an 1894 ghost story by M. R. James